The 2004–05 season was Milton Keynes Dons' inaugural season as a new club following the team's change of name from Wimbledon FC on 21 June 2004. This change of name followed the controversial relocation of Wimbledon FC during the previous 2003–04 season.

Following Wimbledon FC's relegation from the 2003–04 Football League First Division, Milton Keynes Dons played their first season in the newly re-branded Football League One (formerly known as the Second Division).

As well as competing in League One, the club also participated in the FA Cup, League Cup and League Trophy.

The season covers the period from 1 July 2004 to 30 June 2005.

Competitions

League One

League table

Results summary

Matches

FA Cup

League Cup

League Trophy

Squad

 Note: Players' ages as of the opening match of the 2004–05 season.

Squad statistics

Top scorers

Disciplinary record

Clean sheets

Transfers

Transfers in

Transfers out

Loans in

Loans out

References

External links

Official Supporters Association website
MK Dons news on MKWeb

Milton Keynes Dons
Milton Keynes Dons F.C. seasons